This is a list of people of the Khattak Pashtun tribe.

 Khushal Khan Khattak, a Pashtun malik, poet, warrior, and tribal chief
 Afzal Khan Khattak, chief of the Khattak tribe, Pashto poet, and author
 [Master Khan Gul Khattak] (1912–71), a politician, journalist and social worker, elected to the National Assembly from Karak
 Aslam Khattak (1908 – 2008), politician and diplomat from KPK province
 Yusuf Khattak (1917 – 1991), politician, lawyer, and activist
 Nasrullah Khan Khattak, (1928 - 2 November 2009) was a Pakistani politician from the Khyber-Pakhtunkhwa province. He was born in the village of Manki, Nowshera District Pakistan. Former Chief Minister Khyber-Pakhtunkhwa (Then N.W.F.P)
Lt: General ObaidUllah Khan Khattak (18 Field) (Born: Lachi, Kohat) was a Pakistani General, promoted to the rank of Lieutenant General on 20 December 2013 when in Balochistan was serving as Inspector General of the Pakistan's paramilitary Frontier Corps force. He served as IG Arms-GHQ Rawalpindi, Commander Army Strategic Force, GOC Kharian, IGFC Balochistan.He was appointed to the Commander Army Strategic Force due to his extensive experiences in the restive province of Balochistan. He dealt with the hostile elements and militancy in the province via strategic implications which could detach the province from Pakistan.
 Ajmal Khattak, (born 15 September 1925, died 7 February 2010) in Akora Khattak was a Pakistani politician, writer, Pashto poet, Khudai Khidmatgar, former President of Awami National Party.
 Alam Khattak, Lieutenant General Muhammad Alam Khattak, HI (M), TBT, is a Pakistani Army general who is presently the Commander Southern Command based at Quetta. He took over the command in October 2011 after staying as Chief of Logistics Staff at the Army headquarters for two years. Khattak was previously in charge of the Frontier Corps as its Inspector-General.
 Habibullah Khan Khattak, Lieutenant General Habibullah Khan Khattak (October 17, 1913 – 1994) was a Lieutenant General in Pak Army.
 Masood Sharif Khan Khattak, born June 5, 1950, in the city of Karak Pakistan, is a civilian intelligence officer and the first and former director general of the Intelligence Bureau (I.B).
 Ali Kuli Khan Khattak, born in Karak Pakistan Lieutenant General Ali Kuli Khan Khattak, is a Pakistani, senior retired three-star general and military strategist who was a former Chief of General Staff (CGS), Commander X Corps (Rawalpindi) and Director General Military Intelligence of the Pakistan Army.
 Ghulam Faruque Khan (1899–1990) was a dynamic bureaucrat, politician, and industrialist of Pakistan. He belonged to the village Shaidu (Khan Khel) in Nowshera District. His contribution to Pakistan's industrial development he is sometimes described as "The Goliath who Industrialized Pakistan".
 Pareshan Khattak, (b. 10 December 1931 - d. 16 April 2009) from  Karak Pakistan. His real name was Ghamay jan khattak "Pashto" پښتو" غمے جان خټک",  he was a former Vice-Chancellor, Pashto poet and writer and former Chairman University Grants Commission of Pakistan. His books titled “Pukhtana Kochay,” “Dozakhi Pakhto,” “Drana Pukhtana,” “Khyber,” “Iteraff,” and “Aziza Meena” are popular reads in Khyber-Pakhtunkhwa Pakistan and Afghanistan.
 Afrasiab Khattak, (b. 2 October 1951) is a retired Pakistani Senator and a senior politician, remained the head of Human Rights Commission of Pakistan twice. Has played an important role in amending the constitution during 18th amendment in 2010. An intellectual, a poet and humble, down-to-earth politician from District Kohat, Pakistan, Afrasiab Khattak spent all his life for the supremacy of the constitution and championing in human rights in Pakistan.
 Pervez Khattak, (b.1 January 1950)  22nd Chief Minister of Khyber Pakhtunkhwa Pakistan and current Minister of Defence of Pakistan

References

Karlani Pashtun tribes